Croatian-Hungarian Party was the name of a 19th-century political party in the Habsburg Kingdom of Croatia and the Kingdom of Croatia-Slavonia which advocated closer ties between Croatia and Hungary. It was officially named  in 1841 when it participated in the council of Varaždin County. It was one of the two parties in the 1843 session of the Croatian Parliament. It temporarily ceased to function in 1849, following the Revolutions of 1848; when it was reconstituted in 1860, it was named the Unionist Party, and entered the Parliament in 1861. It was also known as the National Constitutional Party.

Several 19th-century Ministers of Croatian Affairs of Hungary and Bans of Croatia were members of the party.

See also
 July victims

References

Sources
  (Wikisource)

Political parties established in 1841
Political parties disestablished in 1918
Political parties in Austria-Hungary
Defunct political parties in Croatia
1841 establishments in the Austrian Empire